Passaic is a NJ Transit rail station served by Main Line trains in Passaic, New Jersey. The station is located in the Passaic Park section of Passaic at an intersection that links Passaic Avenue and Van Houten Avenue with Lackawanna Place. The Hoboken bound platform is located on the Passaic Avenue side of the station and the Suffern bound platform is located at the intersection of Van Houten Avenue and Lackawanna Place. Pedestrian access to both platforms is available on Passaic Avenue, but an underpass is also available to connect both sides.

History
The Boonton Branch of the Delaware, Lackawanna and Western Railroad was first constructed as a freight bypass of the Morris & Essex Railroad in 1868. This was constructed due to the lack of suitability for freight along its passenger lines (due to curves and inclines) and stretched from the Denville station to Hoboken Terminal via Boonton and Paterson. Freight service began on September 12, 1870, while passenger service began on December 14, 1870.

Station layout
The station has two tracks, each with a low-level side platform. There are two parking lots, one on either side of the station, and an underpass between platforms.

Bibliography

References

External links

 Passaic Avenue entrance from Google Maps Street View
 Station House from Google Maps Street View

NJ Transit Rail Operations stations
Railway stations in Passaic County, New Jersey
Former Delaware, Lackawanna and Western Railroad stations
Buildings and structures in Passaic, New Jersey
1870 establishments in New Jersey
Railway stations in the United States opened in 1870